The 2011 FIA GT1 Navarra round was an auto racing event held at the Circuito de Navarra, Los Arcos, Spain on 1–3 July, and was the sixth round of the 2011 FIA GT1 World Championship season. It was the FIA GT1 World Championship's second race held at the  Navarra. The event was supported by the FIA GT3 European Championship and MINI Challenge España.

Background

After a collision between the two Swiss Racing Team Lamborghini's at the Sachsenring round, the team decided to miss the Navarra round which is the second round in a row they have missed an event. Exim Bank Team China recruited Belgian driver Nico Verdonck for this round, replacing Andreas Zuber. He raced in three race weekends in 2010 for Triple H Team Hegersport. Nick Catsburg returned to GT1 after being replaced by Exim Bank Team China in the previous round. He was behind the wheel of the No. 20 Sumo Power Nissan, replacing Warren Hughes. Marc VDS recruited IndyCar Series driver Bertrand Baguette for this round, replacing Frédéric Makowiecki behind the wheel of car No. 41.

Qualifying

Qualifying result
For qualifying, Driver 1 participates in the first and third sessions while Driver 2 participates in only the second session.  The fastest lap for each session is indicated with bold.

Races

Qualifying Race

Race result

Championship Race

Race result

References

External links
 Navarra GT1 Race in Spain – FIA GT1 World Championship

Navarra
FIA GT1